Coleolissus is a genus of beetles in the family Carabidae, first described by Henry Bates in 1892.

Species 
Coleolissus contains the following species:

 Coleolissus angulatus Darlington, 1968
 Coleolissus azumai Habu, 1973
 Coleolissus biakensis Baehr, 2018
 Coleolissus bicoloripes (Bates, 1892)
 Coleolissus buruensis Habu, 1973
 Coleolissus cupripennis N.Ito, 2014
 Coleolissus cyanescens N.Ito, 1993
 Coleolissus debilopunctatus N.Ito, 2006
 Coleolissus doisaketensis N.Ito, 2008
 Coleolissus elongatus N.Ito, 1991
 Coleolissus eulamprus (Bates, 1892)
 Coleolissus formosanus N.Ito, 1993
 Coleolissus fulvomarginatus N.Ito, 2017
 Coleolissus impunctatus N.Ito, 2014
 Coleolissus inessae Kataev, 2021
 Coleolissus iridipennis N.Ito, 1999
 Coleolissus iris (Andrewes, 1924)
 Coleolissus kalisi Louwerens, 1952
 Coleolissus katoi N.Ito, 2001
 Coleolissus kimanisensis N.Ito, 2014
 Coleolissus kiyoyamai N.Ito, 1987
 Coleolissus lamprotus (Bates, 1892)
 Coleolissus latemarginatus N.Ito, 2004
 Coleolissus leveri Emden, 1937
 Coleolissus masumotoi N.Ito, 1991
 Coleolissus missai Baehr, 2018
 Coleolissus nakajimai N.Ito, 2016
 Coleolissus nigricans N.Ito, 1987
 Coleolissus nigridorsis N.Ito, 2014
 Coleolissus nigrocupreus N.Ito & Liang, 2018
 Coleolissus niisatoi N.Ito, 2017
 Coleolissus nitens Andrewes, 1933
 Coleolissus nitidus N.Ito, 1991
 Coleolissus noeli (Andrewes, 1930)
 Coleolissus novaeirlandicus Baehr, 2018
 Coleolissus ohkurai N.Ito, 1993
 Coleolissus ohtanii N.Ito & Liang, 2018
 Coleolissus papua Darlington, 1968
 Coleolissus perlucens (Bates, 1878)
 Coleolissus philippinus N.Ito, 2001
 Coleolissus puncticollis N.Ito, 2008
 Coleolissus satoi N.Ito, 2007
 Coleolissus shibatai N.Ito, 1987
 Coleolissus similis N.Ito, 1993
 Coleolissus splendens (N.Ito, 1997)
 Coleolissus subcastaneus N.Ito, 2008
 Coleolissus teradai (Habu, 1978)
 Coleolissus turturensis N.Ito, 2016
 Coleolissus viridellus (Bates, 1892)
 Coleolissus yamasakoi N.Ito & Liang, 2018
 Coleolissus yunnanus N.Ito & Wrase, 2000

References

Harpalinae